Anthony John Bukovich (August 30, 1915 — December 19, 2009) was an American ice hockey player who played 17 games for the Detroit Red Wings in the National Hockey League between 1943 and 1945. The rest of his career, which lasted from 1939 to 1948, was spent in the minor leagues. He was born in Painesdale, Michigan. At the time of his death, at the age of 94 in Hancock, Michigan, he was the oldest former member of the Detroit Red Wings.

Career statistics

Regular season and playoffs

References

External links
 
Profile of Tony Bukovich, including mention of his death

1915 births
2009 deaths
American men's ice hockey left wingers
Cleveland Barons (1937–1973) players
Detroit Red Wings players
Fort Worth Rangers players
Ice hockey players from Michigan
Indianapolis Capitals players
Minneapolis Millers (AHA) players
People from Houghton County, Michigan